The hydroxycarboxylic acid receptor (abbreviated HCA receptor and HCAR) family includes the following human proteins:

 Hydroxycarboxylic acid receptor 1 (HCA1, formerly known as GPR81)
 Hydroxycarboxylic acid receptor 2 (HCA2, formerly known as niacin receptor 1 and GPR109A)
 Hydroxycarboxylic acid receptor 3 (HCA3, formerly known as niacin receptor 2 and GPR109B)